The following is a list of notable deaths in April 2005.

Entries for each day are listed alphabetically by surname. A typical entry lists information in the following sequence:
 Name, age, country of citizenship at birth, subsequent country of citizenship (if applicable), reason for notability, cause of death (if known), and reference.

April 2005

1
Greg Aim, 71, New Zealand cricketer.
Álvaro Alsogaray, 91, Argentinian politician and businessman.
Philip Amelio, 27, American actor and teacher..
Cheryl Barrymore, 56, English dancer and talent manager, former wife and agent of British TV entertainer Michael Barrymore, lung cancer.
Paul Bomani, 80, Tanzanian politician and diplomat.
Alexander Brott, 90, Canadian composer, conductor and violinist.
Harald Juhnke, 75, German entertainer.
Jack Keller, 68, American songwriter, wrote themes to Bewitched and Gidget.
Jacques Rabemananjara, 92, Malagasy politician, foreign minister from 1967 to 1972,
Barry Stern, 45, American drummer for the bands Trouble and Zoetrope, from complications following surgery.
Miguel Vila Luna, 61, Dominican architect and painter.
Robert Coldwell Wood, 81, American political scientist, second Secretary of Housing and Urban Development, later served as University of Massachusetts President 1970-1977, stomach cancer.

2
Betty Bolton, 99, English actress and singer.
Trevor Foster, 90, Welsh rugby player.
Jack Stanley Gibson, 95, Irish physician.
Pope John Paul II, (Karol Wojtyła), 84, Polish Roman Catholic pope, septic shock and cardio-circulatory collapse.
Nasri Maalouf, 94, Lebanese politician.
John O'Leary, 58, American politician, former U.S. ambassador to Chile, Lou Gehrig's disease.

3
Aleksy Antkiewicz, 81, Polish boxer.
Rick Blight, 49, Canadian ice hockey player.
Blanchette Brunoy, 89, French actress.
Tony Croatto, 65, Italian-born Puerto Rican composer-singer, lung and brain cancer.
Deena Burton, 56, American dancer.
Frank Clair, 87, Canadian Football League coach with the Toronto Argonauts and Ottawa Rough Riders, heart failure.
Kader Firoud, 85, Algerian-born French football player and manager.

4
Gordon Barton, 75, Australian businessman and political activist.
Mark Beban, 65, New Zealand cricketer.
Edward Bronfman, 77, Canadian businessman and philanthropist, colon cancer.
Antonio Rivera, 41, Puerto Rican world champion boxer.
Edmund Roßmann, 87, Nazi Germany Luftwaffe fighter ace during World War II.

5
Manuel Ballester, 85, Spanish chemist.
Marta Belen, 62, American singer.
Saul Bellow, 89, Canadian-born American Nobel Prize-winning author.
Julian C. Boyd, 73, American linguist.
Sir Edwin Leather, 85, Canadian-born governor of Bermuda from 1973 to 1977.
Dale Messick, 98, American creator of the Brenda Starr comic strip.
Debralee Scott, 52, American actress (Mary Hartman, Mary Hartman, Forever Fernwood, Police Academy).
Neil Welliver, 75, American landscape painter, mainly in his native Maine.

6
Eileen Rose Busby, 82, American antiques expert.
Arthur Bywater, 91, British civil servant, winner of the George Cross.
Edwin Q. Cannon, 86, American businessman and politician.
Frank Conroy, 69, American author, memoirist and head of the University of Iowa's famous Iowa Writers' Workshop.
Anthony DePalma, 100, American orthopedic surgeon, teacher, and humanitarian.
Károly Ecser, Hungarian Olympic weightlifter.
Len Junor, 90, Australian cricketer.
Francesco Laudadio, 55, Italian film director, screenwriter and producer.
Geoff Millman, 70, English cricketer.
Rainier III, Prince of Monaco, 81, Monegasque reigning Prince of Monaco since 1949.

7
Cliff Allison, 73, British Formula One driver.
J. Carter Bacot, 72, American banker.
Grigoris Bithikotsis, 82, Greek singer.
Bob Kennedy, 84, American Major League Baseball player and manager.
Charles Kuentz, 108, German-born centenarian and World War I veteran, last surviving French World War I veteran to fight for Germany, cardiac arrest.
Jose Melis, 85, Cuban-born American former bandleader for The Tonight Show.
Yvonne Vera, 40, Zimbabwean novelist and writer.
Erna Woll, 88, German composer and church musician.

8
Raúl Gibb Guerrero, Mexican editor and journalist, murdered.
Maurice Lafont, 77, French football player.
Eddie Miksis, 78, American baseball player.
Yoshitaro Nomura, 85, Japanese film director.
D. G. Northcott, 88, British mathematician (ideal theory).
Onna White, 83, Canadian Broadway choreographer.

9
Scott Field Bailey, 89, American bishop of the Episcopal Diocese of West Texas.
César Civita, 99, American-Argentine publisher.
Andrea Dworkin, 58, American radical feminist writer and anti-pornography activist, myocarditis.
Anton Heyboer, 81, Dutch painter and printmaker.
Scott Mason, 28, Australian cricketer, heart attack.
Alan Randall, 70, English multi-instrumentalist and entertainer, motor neurone disease.
Jerrel Wilson, 63, American football player, cancer.

10
Carl Abrahams, 93, Jamaican painter.
Norbert Brainin, 82, Austrian violinist and founder of the Amadeus Quartet.
Frederick C. Branch, 82, American officer, first Afro-American Marine Corps officer.
Horacio Casarín, 86, Mexican football player and coach.
Chen Yifei, 58, Chinese painter.
Scott Gottlieb, 34, American drummer for rock band Bleed the Dream.
Archbishop Iakovos, 93, Ottoman-born former primate of the Greek Orthodox Archdiocese of America (1959–1996).
Al Lucas, 26, American ex-National Football League player, spinal cord injury suffered playing an Arena Football League game.
Faith McNulty, 86, American writer.

11
Juozas Bagdonas, 92, Lithuanian painter.
John Bennett, 75, British actor (Watership Down, The Pianist, Doctor Who).
Teodoro Borlongan, 49, Filipino banker.
John Brosnan, 57, British resident Australian writer and film critic, acute pancreatitis.
Jerry Byrd, 85, American Lap steel guitarist.
André François, 89, French cartoonist.
James Hamilton, 87, British politician.
Maurice Hilleman, 85, American microbiologist.
David Hughes, 74, British novelist.
Lucien Laurent, 97, French football player, scored the first ever goal at a FIFA World Cup.
Mattie McDonagh, 68, Irish Gaelic footballer.
George Younce, 75, American Southern Gospel singer.

12
Sorrel Carson, 85, Irish actress and drama teacher.
Ehud Manor, 63, Israeli songwriter.
George Molchan, 82, American spokesperson for Oscar Mayer meat company.
Barney Poole, 81, American College Football Hall of Fame member.
Cyril Sidlow, 89, Welsh football player.
Kevin Stuart, 76, New Zealand rugby union player.
Nelly Uchendu, 54/5, Nigerian musician.
Rodolfo Gonzales, 76, Mexican boxer, poet, political organizer, and activist.

13
Don Blasingame, 73, American MLB All-Star, who also managed two of Japan's professional baseball teams.
Simon Blumenfeld, 97, British writer.
Tutti Camarata, 91, American musician, leader of "Tutti's Trumpets" and co-founder of Disneyland Records.
Julia Darling, 48, English novelist and poet.
Wolfgang Droege, 55, German-born Canadian founder of the Canadian white supremacist group the Heritage Front, shot to death.
Kay Gardella, 82, American television critic for the New York Daily News, cancer.
Johnnie Johnson, 80, American musician.
Nikola Ljubicic, 89, Serbian general and politician, president of Serbia from 1982 to 1984.
Philippe Volter, 45, Belgian actor, suicide.
Nathaniel Weyl, 94, American writer, economist who testified in the Alger Hiss case.
Juan Zanotto, 69, Italian-Argentinian comic book artist.
Johnny Loughrey, 59, Irish singer.

14
Chet Aubuchon, 88, American basketball player.
Benny Bailey, 79, American jazz trumpeter.
Andrew Bisset, 52, Australian author and musician.
John Fred Gourrier, 63, American 1960s pop singer.
Saunders Mac Lane, 95, American  mathematician.
Richard Popkin, 81, American academic philosopher.
Sir Rollo Pain, 83, British army general.

15
Jimmy Allan, 73, Scottish cricketer.
Al Baisi, 87, American football player.
Martin Blumenson, 86, American military historian.
Peter Cargill, 41, Jamaican footballer.
Art Cross, 87, American Indianapolis 500 driver.
Jaime Fernández, 67, Mexican actor.
John Hultberg, 83, American avant-garde painter.
 George Arthur Padmore, Liberian diplomat, Liberian Ambassador to the United States (1956–1961).
Margaretta Scott, 93, English actress ("Mrs. Pumphrey" in All Creatures Great and Small).
Duilio Spagnolo, 78, Italian boxer, former heavyweight contender.

16
Laura Canales, 50, American Tejano singer.
Herm Gilliam, 58, American National Basketball Association player (Portland Trail Blazers).
Kim Mu-saeng, 62, South Korean actor, pneumonia.
Marla Ruzicka, 28, American activist and aid worker, car bombing in Iraq.
Volker Vogeler, 74, German film director and screenwriter.
Kay Walsh, 93, British actress.

17
Hans Gruijters, 73, Dutch politician and journalist.
James Archibald Houston, 83, Canadian author and artist.
Vishnu Kant Shastri, 76, Indian politician.
Juan Pablo Torres, 58, Cuban trombonist, bandleader, arranger and producer, brain tumor.

18
Sir Piers Bengough, 75, British soldier and Her Majesty's Representative at Ascot.
Donald Bruce, Baron Bruce of Donington, 92, British politician and peer.
Peter F. Flaherty, 80, American politician and attorney.
Bassel Fleihan, 42, Lebanese deputy and former minister, third-degree burns resulting from the blast that assassinated Rafiq Hariri.
Clarence Gaines, 81, American Basketball Hall of Fame coach, stroke.
Sam Mills, 45, American former NFL player and assistant coach, cancer.
Kenneth Schermerhorn, 75, American music director and conductor of the Nashville Symphony Orchestra, Non-Hodgkin lymphoma.

19
Mike Brim, 39, American football player.
George P. Cosmatos, 65, Italian-born Greek-American film director (Tombstone, Rambo: First Blood Part II, Cobra), lung cancer.
Ruth Hussey, 93, American film actress (The Philadelphia Story).
Stan Levey, 79, American jazz drummer.
Clement Meadmore, 76, Australian-born steel sculptor.
Bryan Ottoson, 27, American Head Charge guitarist.
Niels-Henning Ørsted Pedersen, 58, Danish jazz upright bassist.

20
Inday Ba, 32, Swedish actress (also known as N'Deaye Ba).
Zygfryd Blaut, 62, Polish football player.
Gene Frankel, 85, United States theater director.
Ea Jansen, 83, Estonian historian.
Fumio Niwa, 100, Japanese novelist.

21
Giordano Abbondati, 56, Italian figure skater.
Ed Butka, 89, American baseball player.
Zhang Chunqiao, 88, Chinese political theorist, member of the Gang of Four.
Gwynfor Evans, 92, Welsh politician.
Bill Kaysing, 82, American conspiracy theorist.
Feroze Khan, 100, Pakistani field hockey player, Olympic Champion 1928 (oldest Olympic gold medallist at the time of his death).
Heinz Kluncker, 80, German trade union leader.
Cyril Tawney, 74, British songwriter and folksinger.
Jimmy Thompson, 79, British actor and comic.

22
Norman Bird, 80, British actor (Worzel Gummidge, The Lord of the Rings, Look and Read).
Joseph Bogen, 78, American neurosurgeon, epileptic seizure researcher.
Gregoire Boonzaier, 95, South African painter.
Mary Dann, early 80s, American Indian activist.
Erika Fuchs, 98, German Disney comics editor and translator.
John Marshall, 72, American filmmaker.
Philip Morrison, 89, American physicist and group leader in the Manhattan Project.
Sir Eduardo Paolozzi, 81, Scottish sculptor.
Leonid Shamkovich, 81, Russian ex-Soviet grandmaster chess player.

23
Sir Joh Bjelke-Petersen, 94, Australian political celebrity, longest-serving Premier of Queensland.
Robert Farnon, 87, Canadian-born Grammy Award winning arranger, composer.
Andre Gunder Frank, 76, German economic historian, proponent of dependency theory.
Al Grassby, 78, Australian former politician and minister in the Whitlam government.
Sir John Mills, 97, British actor (Ryan's Daughter, Swiss Family Robinson, Gandhi), Oscar winner (1971).
John Pott, 85, British World War II Army officer.
Romano Scarpa, 78, Italian Disney comic book artist.
J. B. Stoner, 81, American neo-nazi, segregationist politician, and a domestic terrorist.
Earl Wilson, 70, American baseball player, leading pitcher for the 1968 World Series champion Detroit Tigers and second black pitcher to throw a no-hitter in Major League Baseball, heart attack.
Jimmy Woode, 78, American jazz bassist, heart attack.

24
Adelle August, 71, American actress.
Francis Bay, 90, Belgian conductor.
Ralph Buchanan, 82, Canadian ice hockey player.
Fei Xiaotong, 94, Chinese researcher and professor of sociology and anthropology.
Ezer Weizman, 80, Israeli politician, former Israeli president.

25
Jim Barker, 69, American politician, stroke.
John Love, 80, Rhodesian Formula One driver.
Swami Ranganathananda, 96, Indian religious leader, President of the Ramakrishna Order.
Alexander Trotman, Baron Trotman, 71, English chief executive and peer, head of Ford Motor Company.
Samuel Williamson, American scientist.

26
Mason Adams, 86, American actor (Lou Grant, F/X, Omen III: The Final Conflict).
Hasil Adkins, 67, American Rockabilly musician.
Georges Anderla, 84, French economist.
Gordon Campbell, Baron Campbell of Croy, 83, Scottish politician.
Lafayette Morgan, 74, Liberian economist.
Josef Nesvadba, 78, Czech psychiatrist and science fiction author.
Augusto Roa Bastos, 87, Paraguayan writer, winner of the Premio Cervantes.
Johnny Sample, 67, American former National Football League player.
Maria Schell, 79, Austrian actress (The Last Bridge, Gervaise, Superman), pneumonia.

27
Richard Appleton, 72, Australian poet and editor..
Abdus Samad Azad, 83, Bangladeshi diplomat and politician, former foreign minister of Bangladesh.
Red Horner, 95, Canadian ice hockey player, former NHL player with the Toronto Maple Leafs.
Tunney Hunsaker, 75, American professional boxer, Muhammad Ali's first professional boxing opponent.
Stanley Orme, Baron Orme, 82, British politician,
Howard W. Johnston, 91, German principal founder of the Free University of Berlin.
Ebrahim Sulaiman Sait, 82, Indian politician.

28
Chuck Bittick, 65, American water polo player.
Chris Candido, 33, American professional wrestler, blood clot from surgery complications.
Odysseas Dimitriadis, 96, Georgian-born Greek conductor.
Percy Heath, 81, American bassist for the Modern Jazz Quartet.
Erich Vermehren, 85, German military intelligence officer, World War II defector from the Abwehr.
Zeke Zekley, 90, American cartoonist.

29
William J. Bell, 78, American screenwriter and television producer (The Young and the Restless, The Bold and the Beautiful), Alzheimer's disease.
Dianne Brooks, 66, American jazz singer.
Mel Gussow, 71, American theatre critic for The New York Times, cancer.
Sara Henderson, 69, Australian author.
Leonid Khachiyan, 52, Russian/American mathematician and computer scientist.
Mariana Levy, 39, Mexican actress, heart attack following a robbery attempt.
Johnnie Stewart, 87, British television producer (Top of the Pops).

30
Sylve Bengtsson, 74, Swedish football player.
Wim Esajas, 70, Suriname middle-distance runner.
Lourens Muller, 87, South African politician.
Phil Rasmussen, 86, American Army Air Corps officer, complications from cancer.
Ron Todd, 78, English former general secretary of the Transport and General Workers Union

References

2005-04
 04